HMS Dunedin was a  light cruiser of the Royal Navy, pennant number D93.  She was launched from the yards of Armstrong Whitworth, Newcastle-on-Tyne on 19 November 1918 and commissioned on 13 September 1919.  She has been the only ship of the Royal Navy to bear the name Dunedin (named after the capital of Scotland, generally Anglicised as Edinburgh).

Service history
In October 1920 she, with the other three British vessels, was sent to assure protection of the unloading of munitions intended for Poland, at Danzig.

In 1931 she provided assistance to the town of Napier, New Zealand, after the strong Hawkes Bay earthquake, in a task force with the sloop  and the cruiser .

Second World War
Early in the Second World War, Dunedin was involved in the hunt for the German battleships  and  after the sinking of the armed merchant cruiser .

In early 1940 Dunedin was operating in the Caribbean Sea, and there she intercepted the German merchant ship Heidelberg west of the Windward Passage. Heidelbergs crew scuttled the ship before  Dunedin could take her. A few days later, Dunedin, in company with the Canadian destroyer , intercepted and captured the German merchant ship Hannover near Jamaica. Hannover later became the first British escort carrier, . Between July and November, Dunedin, together with the cruiser , maintained a blockade off Martinique, in part to bottle up three French warships, including the aircraft carrier .

On 15 June 1941, Dunedin captured the German tanker Lothringen and gathered some highly classified Enigma cipher machines that she carried. The Royal Navy reused Lothringen as the fleet oiler Empire Salvage. Dunedin went on to capture three Vichy French vessels, Ville de Rouen off Natal, the merchant ship Ville de Tamatave east of the Saint Paul's Rocks, and finally, D'Entrecasteaux.

Dunedin was still steaming in the Central Atlantic Ocean, just east of the St. Paul's Rocks, north east of Recife, Brazil, when on 24 November 1941, at 1526 hours, two torpedoes from the  sank her. Only four officers and 63 men survived out of Dunedins crew of 486 officers and men.

References

External links

Royal Navy Log Books of the World War 1
HMS Dunedin at U-boat.net
Ships of the Danae class

Danae-class cruisers of the Royal Navy
Ships built on the River Tyne
1918 ships
World War II naval ships of the United Kingdom
Ships sunk by German submarines in World War II
World War II shipwrecks in the Atlantic Ocean
Maritime incidents in November 1941
World War II cruisers of the United Kingdom
Ships built by Armstrong Whitworth